Colin Charles Withers (21 March 1940 – 28 December 2020) was an English professional footballer who made 245 appearances in the Football League and a further 29 in the Eredivisie. He played as a goalkeeper, making more than 100 appearances for both Birmingham City and Aston Villa. He also appeared briefly for Lincoln City, before playing in the Netherlands for Go Ahead Eagles. He was capped for England at schoolboy level.

References

1940 births
2020 deaths
Footballers from Birmingham, West Midlands
English footballers
England schools international footballers
Association football goalkeepers
Birmingham City F.C. players
Aston Villa F.C. players
Lincoln City F.C. players
Go Ahead Eagles players
Atherstone Town F.C. players
English Football League players
Eredivisie players